The Kentucky State Thorobreds football program represents Kentucky State University in the sport of American football. The Thorobreds compete in the Division II (D2) of the National Collegiate Athletics Association (NCAA) and the Western Division of the Southern Intercollegiate Athletic Conference (SIAC).

References

External links
 

 
American football teams established in 1907
1907 establishments in Kentucky